Valine dehydrogenase (NAD+) is an enzyme with systematic name L-valine:NAD+ oxidoreductase (deaminating). This enzyme catalyses the following chemical reaction

 L-valine + H2O + NAD+  3-methyl-2-oxobutanoate + NH3 + NADH + H+

The enzyme from Streptomyces spp. has no activity with NADP+.

See also 
 Valine dehydrogenase (NADP+)

References

External links 
 

EC 1.4.1